Little Johnny Jet is a 1953 Metro-Goldwyn-Mayer cartoon studio cartoon short directed by Tex Avery about a "family" of airplanes. The title is a play on Little Johnny Jones. The screenplay was written by Heck Allen. The film score was composed by Scott Bradley. The film was produced by Fred Quimby. It was nominated for the Academy Award for Best Animated Short Film but lost to the Tom and Jerry short Johann Mouse.

Synopsis
The cartoon follows the story of a B-29 Bomber named John (voiced by Daws Butler), who is married to a Douglas DC-3 named Mary (voiced by Colleen Collins). John cannot seem to find work at any airport, because they are looking for jets. Mary later reveals that she is going to have a baby. Needing to find work to support his family, Johnny heads off to reenlist in the Air Force. The Air Force refuses his job application, as they are looking for jets as well, which further angers him. When Junior finally arrives, John is happy to be a father and have a child, until it turns out that Junior is a jet as well. John loses his mind.

When reading the paper the next day, the Hot Air News, John sees the ad for a jet contest held by the United States Government where the winner gets a huge contract. Plenty fed up with jets, he goes to enter the contest as well to try to show them up. Realizing that risk that her husband is putting himself, Mary (with Junior in tow) goes after John. En route to the contest, John meets a B-29 general who smokes Douglas MacArthur's trademark corncob pipe and has Bataan written amidst his five stars. When John asks him, the general declines to enter the contest and states, parodying MacArthur's farewell address to the U.S. Congress, that "older planes never fly, they just fade away," before literally fading away.

At the contest, John lines up at the starting line with the rest of the jets. Mary and Junior catch up to him and Mary tries convincing John not to go through with the race, but John refuses to listen to her. While this was happening, Junior gets out of the baby buggy and gets in the fuselage of John, and by the time Mary realizes that her son is there, it is too late.

At the green flag, the jets all but disappear while John, in comparison, sputters badly to take off and run the race. Within no time, his engines have had enough and detach from his body and fly away on their own, sending him into a nose dive for Earth. Junior realizes what is happening and after a brief struggle with the door, manages to get out of him in time to grab him by the tail and save him. When John notices that he has not crashed, he looks back and sees his son holding his tail and flying him along. After happily praising him for saving him, they then kick into high gear and run the race, tearing past the other contestants (freaking them out in the process), and are shown flying around the world, going by certain landmarks with funny things happening (the Eiffel Tower pulling itself open to let them through, the Leaning Tower of Pisa tilting the other way, they fly by a huge cloud of smog which is completely removed to reveal Los Angeles, the Statue of Liberty's dress blows open to reveal then-rather risqué lingerie on it (leaving Junior perplexed), etc.), and a few non-landmark things as well (a blimp gets cut in half to look like a watermelon, a sky-written ad for a cola changes to read "BURP!", an ocean liner gets shrunk down to a tugboat, and a rainbow literally tied up like a bow, etc.).

They easily win the race and the government contract for Junior. While John is happy for his son, he is shocked when the government tells him that they need ten-thousand more just like him—John realizes that he and Mary have some serious procreating to do.

See also
 One Cab's Family

References

External links
 

1953 animated films
1953 short films
1953 films
American aviation films
Films directed by Tex Avery
1950s American animated films
1950s animated short films
Metro-Goldwyn-Mayer animated short films
New York City in fiction
Paris in fiction
Los Angeles in fiction
Pisa in fiction
Films about competitions
Animated films about aviation
Films with screenplays by Henry Wilson Allen
Films scored by Scott Bradley
Films produced by Fred Quimby
Metro-Goldwyn-Mayer cartoon studio short films
1950s English-language films